Jacoba van den Brande (4 July 1735 – 14 August 1794) was a Dutch culture personality. She was the founding chairman of the Physics Society of Women in Middelburg.

Life and career 
Jacoba van den Brande was born on 4 July 1735 in Middelburg in the Netherlands. She was the daughter of Johan Pieter van den Brande (1707-1758) and Mary Heron Berg (1707-1775), both of whom came from prominent Zeeland families.

Van den Brande married Johan Adriaen van de Perre (1738-1790), member of the States-General between 1768 and 1779, in 1760. Her spouse was a benefactor of numerous academies and societies, and Jacoba herself also became known as such. She was the founder and first chairperson of the Physics/Natural History  Society of Women in Middelburg (Dutch: Natuurkundig Genootschap der Dames te Middelburg) (1785), the first all-female science academy in the world.

Van den Brande died on 14 August 1794, at the age of 59, in Middelburg.

References

1735 births
1794 deaths
18th-century Dutch people
Dutch feminists
18th-century Dutch scientists
Dutch women academics
Dutch women scientists
Dutch nobility
People from Middelburg, Zeeland